Hephaestion (356 BC–324 BC) was Alexander's celebrated friend and general.

Hephaestion or Hephaistion may also refer to:

 Hephaestion (beetle), a genus of beetles
 Hephaestion (grammarian) of Alexandria, who flourished in the age of the Antonines
 Hephestion (horse) (foaled 1807), a British Thoroughbred racehorse
 Hephaestion of Thebes, 5th century astrologer

See also
 Hephaestin, a protein involved in the metabolism and homeostasis of iron
 Hephaesteion, the Temple of Hephaestus, Athens, Greece